CHSR may refer to:

 CHSR-FM, a radio station (97.9 FM) licensed to Fredericton, New Brunswick, Canada
 California High-Speed Rail
 Chillicothe Southern Railroad

Broadcast call sign disambiguation pages